ToughLove was an Australian comedic radio talk program broadcast from Melbourne through the Triple M network from 12:00PM – 1:00PM AEST in Melbourne, Sydney, Brisbane and Adelaide.

It was hosted by long-time Australian comic, Mick Molloy and co-hosted by Robyn Butler and  Mick's brother Richard Molloy aka 'Roo'. Panel operator Rosemary Walton was occasionally heard in the background laughing. In its first year (2004) the show ran for two hours (10:00AM – 12:00PM) and was also co-hosted by comedian/actor Alan Brough. During this time, a regular feature of the show was Robyn's fictional characters, including "Mrs. Yi" and "Rosita", however since the timeslot change, these characters appear to have been dropped. The show finished in 2006 when Mick Molloy decided to leave radio.

The ToughLove team

Segments 
Regular segments include Bombshells, Stupid Behaviour, Zero Tolerance, The ToughLove Enshitelopedia and Bang Out Of Order.

Promotion 
During 2004, as a promotion for the show, the station released a series of billboards in the style of Calvin Klein picturing Mick taking off his underpants adorning the phrase "Turn Me On And Dress Me Down". During September of that year, one of the billboards was auctioned on eBay with all proceeds going to the Lighthouse Foundation. A Melbourne man, Tim Dellar, unwittingly bid for the billboard and "won" the 41 square metre sign.

Podcast
Highlights of the show were made available as a weekly podcast downloadable from the Triple M website. Many of their various guests, callers, sketches, and segments were featured. There were a number of special podcasts made available following Mick and Roo's trip to London.

End of ToughLove
At the end of 2006, Mick Molloy decided to leave radio, which meant ToughLove did not return, as noted in a statement released by Triple M that announced the new program lineup for 2007. Tony Martin's Get This was moved from the 9am slot to the midday slot, thus replacing Tough Love. In the statement, Molloy said: "The relentless grind of a one-hour national radio show has finally taken its toll. The midday starts were also brutal, often playing havoc with my sleeping patterns. It's definitely a younger man's game".

References

Australian radio programs
2000s Australian radio programs